Sicom test srl is an Italian test and certification laboratory for telecommunication products. 
Sicom was founded in 2003 and is based at the 'AREA Science Park in Trieste.

Profile 

Sicom is a test laboratory for telecommunication, unique in 
Italy, both for the specific skill of its
staff and for the instrumentation at its disposal. 
The laboratory plays an intense research and development to keep 
updated with the constantly evolving technology, and offers to the  
telecommunications companies, test and certification services.

(Source: AREA Science Park)

See also

 List of Italian Companies

External links 
official website 
AREA Science Park site

Electronics companies of Italy